Special Constable Brandon Moss GC (5 June 1909 – 9 August 1999) was a British police officer who was awarded the George Cross for his "superhuman efforts and utter disregard for personal injury" while with the Coventry Constabulary during World War II.

Life
Moss was born in 1909 and he was one of six children.

Moss married Vera Watson and had two daughters. He died, aged 90, in Coventry on 9 August 1999.

14 November 1940
On the night of 14/15 November 1940, following a heavy Luftwaffe air raid consisting of 437 aircraft dropping 394 tons of high explosives and 127 parachute mines (part of the Coventry Blitz), Moss led two rescue attempts on houses which had been destroyed by a high explosive bomb. Managing to free three people trapped in the rubble in the first house and another person in the second after seven hours of digging through the night. He also recovered four bodies.

A fractured gas main, further air raids and a delayed action bomb no more than twenty yards from the scene added to the danger of falling masonry and structural collapse.

George Cross citation
The citation for his award was published in the London Gazette on 13 December 1940, when he was presented with the George Cross by King George VI at Buckingham Palace.

His George Cross is now on display at the Lord Ashcroft VC Gallery in the Imperial War Museum, London.

Honours

References

British recipients of the George Cross
British special constables
1909 births
1999 deaths
People from Coventry
British people of World War II
People from Brandon, Suffolk